Ebo Taylor (born 1936) is a Ghanaian guitarist, composer, bandleader, record producer and arranger focusing on highlife and afrobeat music.

Career

Ebo Taylor has been a pivotal figure on the Ghanaian music scene for over six decades. In the late 1950s he was active in the influential highlife bands the Stargazers and the Broadway Dance Band. In 1962, Taylor took his group, the Black Star Highlife Band, to London. In London, Taylor collaborated with Nigerian afrobeat star Fela Kuti as well as other African musicians in Britain at the time.

Returning to Ghana, Taylor worked as a producer, crafting recordings for Pat Thomas, C. K. Mann, and others, as well as exploring solo projects, combining traditional Ghanaian material with afrobeat, jazz, and funk rhythms to create his own recognizable sound in the 1970s. He was the inhouse guitar player, arranger, and producer for Essiebons, founded by Dick Essilfie-Bondzie.

Taylor's work became popular internationally with hip-hop producers in the 21st century. In 1992, Ghetto Concept included his afrobeats in their music. In 2008, Ebo Taylor met the Berlin-based musicians of the Afrobeat Academy band, including saxophonist Ben Abarbanel-Wolff, which led to the release of the album Love and Death with Strut Records (his first internationally distributed album). In 2010, Usher used a sample from Taylor's song "Heaven" for "She Don't Know" with Ludacris.

He collaborated with the Afrobeat Academy in Berlin in 2011. In 2017, his Ghanaian funk anthem "Come Along," was popular among  DJs.

The success of Love and Death prompted Strut to issue the retrospective Life Stories: Highlife & Afrobeat Classics 1973–1980, in the spring of 2011. A year later, in 2012, a third Strut album, Appia Kwa Bridge, was released. Appia Kwa Bridge showed that at 77 years old, Taylor remained creative, mixing traditional Fante songs and chants with children's rhymes and personal stories into his own sharp vision of highlife.

He performed at the 2015 edition of the annual Stanbic Jazz Festival along with Earl Klugh, Ackah Blay and others.

Awards and recognition 
Life Time Achievement Award - 2014 Vodafone Ghana Music Awards.

Lifetime Achievement Award – 2019 Highlife Music Awards.

Music Legend of the year - 2019 Ghana Business Awards.

Grammy award

Selected discography

Albums

Palaver (Tabansi/BBE Music), 2019 (rec. 1980)
Yen Ara (Mr. Bongo), 2018
Appia Kwa Bridge (Strut Records) 2012
Life Stories: Best of Ebo Taylor 1973–80 (Strut Records) 2012
Love And Death (Strut Records), 2010
Abenkwan Puchaa (Essiebons), 2009
Ebo Taylor, Pat Thomas, Uhuru Yenzu - Hitsville Re-Visited  (LP) (Essiebons), 1982
Pat Thomas & Ebo Taylor - Calypso "Mahuno" and High Lifes Celebration (Pan African Records), 1980
Ebo Taylor & Uhuru Yenzu - Conflict (Essiebons), 1980
Ebo Taylor & Saltpond Barkers Choir - Me Kra Tsie (LP) (Essiebons), 1979
Twer Nyame (Philips-West African-Records) 1978
Ebo Taylor (Essiebons), 1977
My Love And Music (LP) (Gapophone Records), 1976

Contributing artist
The Rough Guide To Psychedelic Africa (World Music Network) 2012

References

1936 births
Living people
Ghanaian highlife musicians
Fela Kuti
Fante people
St. Augustine's College (Cape Coast) alumni